The warty pleurobranch, scientific name Pleurobranchaea bubala, is a species of sea slug, specifically a sidegill slug or notaspidean. It is a marine gastropod mollusc in the family Pleurobranchaeidae.

Distribution
This species is endemic to the South African coast and is found only from Hout Bay to Jeffreys Bay in 5–30 m of water.

Description
The warty pleurobranch has an oval sandy-coloured body with large opaque white bumps on the notum. It has a spade-shaped head and two widely separated rhinophores. There is a single gill on right hand side of body. It can be confused with the dwarf warty pleurobranch, which is smaller, has smoother skin, and can be found in deeper water.

Ecology
This pleurobranch is a voracious predator on other opisthobranchs. It has been seen eating smaller individuals of the same species. Its egg ribbon is a sizeable roll of several white loops.

References

Pleurobranchaeidae